Irish Senior Cup may refer to

Irish Senior Cup (cricket) - knockout competition for senior men's cricket clubs in Ireland
Irish Senior Cup (Men's Hockey) - knockout competition for senior men's hockey clubs in Ireland
Irish Senior Cup (Ladies' Hockey) - knockout competition for senior ladies' hockey clubs in Ireland